Statistics of Czechoslovak First League in the 1983–84 season.

Overview
It was contested by 16 teams, and Sparta Prague won the championship. Werner Lička was the league's top scorer with 20 goals.

Stadia and locations

League standings

Results

Top goalscorers

References

Czechoslovakia - List of final tables (RSSSF)

Czechoslovak First League seasons
Czech
1983–84 in Czechoslovak football